The Cessna Model DC-6 was a 1920s American high-wing four-seat tourer built by the Cessna Aircraft Company. It was used by the United States Army Air Corps as the UC-77/UC-77A.

Design and development
The DC-6 was a scaled-down four-seat version of the six-seat CW-6. It was rolled out in February 1929 and went into production in two versions, the DC-6A and DC-6B. Both versions were type certificated on October 29, 1929. The Wall Street crash that day and subsequent depression reduced demand for the aircraft and only about 20 of each model were produced.

Operational history
In addition to use as private touring aircraft, DC-6As and DC-6Bs saw use as newspaper delivery aircraft and were impressed as liaison aircraft with the United States Army Air Forces (USAAF) in 1942.

Variants

DC-6
The original aircraft, powered by a  Curtiss Challenger, developed as a scaled-down Cessna CW-6.
Model DC-6A Chief
Fitted with a  Wright R-975 (J-6-9) Whirlwind engine; 20 built.
Model DC-6B Scout
Fitted with a  Wright J-6-7 (R-760) engine; 24 built.
UC-77
Military designation of four DC-6As impressed into service by the USAAF.
UC-77A
Military designation of four DC-6Bs impressed into service by the USAAF.

Note that the designations UC-77B, UC-77C and UC-77D were not DC-6s, they were used for the Cessna Airmaster.

Operators

United States Army Air Forces

Specifications (DC-6A Chief)

References

External links

DC-06
1920s United States civil utility aircraft
Cessna DC-6
Single-engined tractor aircraft
High-wing aircraft
Aircraft first flown in 1929